WEDQ (channel 3.4) is a secondary PBS member television station licensed to Tampa, Florida, United States, serving the Tampa Bay area. Owned by Florida West Coast Public Broadcasting, it is a sister station to primary PBS member WEDU (channel 3). The two stations share studios on North Boulevard in Tampa, and transmitter facilities in Riverview, Florida.

History

The station first signed on the air on September 12, 1966, as WUSF-TV, owned by the University of South Florida. Its main rival was WEDU, which has long been one of the highest-rated public television stations in the country. However, due to its ties with the university, most of WUSF's programming was educational in nature—including distance learning, which WUSF aired during the afternoon and late-night hours. WUSF was also known for showing a wide variety of home improvement programming, such as Hometime, during the late 1980s and 1990s that WEDU did not regularly program.

On October 12, 2015, the University of South Florida voted to explore placing WUSF-TV into the FCC's spectrum auction in 2016, a move that could lead to the station sharing a channel with another area station, moving its signal to a VHF channel, or ceasing operations altogether. On February 8, 2017, USF announced that the WUSF-TV license had been sold for $18.8 million in the auction, and that the station would cease operations; on August 11, it announced that the station would go off the air on October 15.

On October 8, it was announced that WUSF-TV had entered into a channel sharing agreement with WEDU, enabling the station to continue operations. WUSF-TV's broadcast license would also be transferred to WEDU's owner, Florida West Coast Public Broadcasting; the transfer was completed on January 24, 2018. USF retained its radio stations, WUSF-FM and WSMR.

On October 15, 2017, at 11:59 p.m., after playing an abbreviated version of "The Star-Spangled Banner," WUSF-TV officially signed off-air and became WEDQ. WEDQ then began airing the secondary schedule of PBS programming that had been on WEDU's fourth subchannel (previously branded as "WEDU Plus"), combined with some of WUSF-TV's more popular shows.

Technical information

Subchannels
The station's digital signal is multiplexed:

After WEDU took control of WUSF-TV and changed its calls to WEDQ, it merged all of WEDU and WEDQ's over-the-air channels as subchannels of WEDU. As a result, WEDQ changed its virtual channel to 3.4, taking the place of the WEDU+ service that had previously aired on WEDU's fourth subchannel. WEDU also began airing WUSF-TV's two former subchannels, PBS Kids and Create, on channels 3.5 and 3.6, respectively.

Analog-to-digital conversion
WUSF-TV shut down its analog signal, over UHF channel 16, on June 12, 2009, as part of the federally mandated transition from analog to digital television. The station's digital signal remained on its pre-transition digital UHF channel 34, using PSIP to display WUSF-TV's virtual channel as 16 on digital television receivers.

References

PBS member stations
Television channels and stations established in 1966
EDQ
1966 establishments in Florida